Social welfare in China has undergone various changes throughout history. The Ministry of Human Resources and Social Security is responsible for the social welfare system. Currently the form of social welfare is in between 40-75% according to their means of production.

Welfare in China is linked to the hukou system. Those holding non-agricultural hukou status have access to a number of programs provided by the government, such as healthcare, employment, retirement pensions, housing, and education. While rural residents traditionally were expected to provide for themselves, in 2014 the Chinese Communist Party announced reforms aimed at providing rural citizens access to historically urban social programs.

In pre-1980s reform China, the socialist state fulfilled the needs of society from cradle to grave. Child care, education, job placement, housing, subsistence, health care, and elder care were largely the responsibility of the work unit as administered through state-owned enterprises and agricultural communes and collectives. As those systems disappeared or were reformed, the "iron rice bowl" approach to welfare changed. Article 14 of the constitution stipulates that the state "builds and improves a welfare system that corresponds with the level of economic development."

In 2004 China experienced the greatest decrease in its poorest population since 1999. People with a per capita income of less than 668 renminbi (RMB; US$80.71) decreased by 2.9 million people or 10 percent; those with a per capita income of less than 924 RMB (US$111.64) decreased by 6.4 million people or 11.4 percent, according to statistics from the State Council’s Poverty Reduction Office.

Welfare reforms since the late 1990s have included unemployment insurance, medical insurance, workers’ compensation insurance, maternity benefits, communal pension funds, individual pension accounts, universal health care.

Furthermore, for many of the minority groups, there are some benefits available.

During July 2020, Beijing social security center put restrictions on the social security withholding and payment, which was allowed to be operational previously via third party organizations.

See also
Public health in the People's Republic of China
Poverty in China
Urbanization in China
Social safety net
Hukou System
Human Rights in China
Censorship in China

References

Further reading
What kind of social welfare system does China need? Economic Information Daily, June 26, 2002

External links
China Center for Insurance and Social Security Research (Peking University)

Welfare in China
Social security in China